The following is a list of the most populous incorporated places in Mexico (municipalities) according to the 2020 Mexican National Census.

This list refers only to the population of individual municipalities within their defined limits, which does not include other municipalities or unincorporated suburban areas within urban agglomerations.

‡ A new municipality, San Quintín, was created out of Ensenada's territory in February 2020.
‡‡ A new municipality, Bacalar, was created out of Othon P. Blanco's territory in February 2011.

See also
 Municipalities of Mexico
 List of cities in Mexico
 List of most populous cities in Mexico by decade
 Metropolitan areas of Mexico
 Demographics of Mexico

References

Cities
Subdivisions of Mexico